Craugastor pozo is a species of frog in the family Craugastoridae. It is endemic to Mexico and known from the western foothills and highlands of Chiapas. The specific name pozo refers to the local name of the area near its type locality, El Pozo (sometimes also known as Pozo Turipache and Pozo La Pera). Common name Pozo Turipache rainfrog has been coined for it.

Description
Males measure  and females  in snout–vent length. The canthus rostralis is sharp and tympanum is distinct. The dorsum is brown, typically with a few black streaks or spots associated with the poorly developed parietal and suprascapular ridges. The prefrontal area is pale brown, separated from the back of the head by an interorbital bar. There are usually conspicuous dark lip and limb bars. The supratympanic ridge has black lower edge. The flanks are cream with bold dark brown mottling or marbling. Large adult males have vocal slits.

Before being recognized as representing a separate species, Craugastor pozo were identified as Craugastor brocchi.

Habitat and conservation
They occur on the forest floor under leaf-litter among limestone boulders and limestone caves. They hide by day and are active on the forest floor and in low vegetation by night. This rare species is threatened by habitat loss. It is not known to occur in any protected area.

References

pozo
Endemic amphibians of Mexico
Amphibians described in 1995
Taxa named by Jay M. Savage
Taxonomy articles created by Polbot